Zarex (Ancient Greek: Ζάρηξ) is the name of a hero of ancient Greek mythology, son of Carystus or Carycus, grandson of Chiron. He married Rhoeo and became the father of Anius. In some accounts, Zarex adopted his wife's son, Anius who been raised by his divine father Apollo.

Mythology 
Zarex was credited with having learned the music of Apollo, and having founded the town of Zarex in Laconia; he also had a heroon at Eleusis, next to that of Hippothoon. There also was a mountain on Euboea thought to be named after him.

Pausanias wrote that there may was also another Zarex, an Athenian hero, but he had nothing to say concerning him.

See also
  for Jovian asteroid 18060 Zarex

Notes

References 

 Pausanias, Description of Greece with an English Translation by W.H.S. Jones, Litt.D., and H.A. Ormerod, M.A., in 4 Volumes. Cambridge, MA, Harvard University Press; London, William Heinemann Ltd. 1918. . Online version at the Perseus Digital Library
Pausanias, Graeciae Descriptio. 3 vols. Leipzig, Teubner. 1903.  Greek text available at the Perseus Digital Library.
 

Greek mythological heroes
Euboean characters in Greek mythology
Laconian mythology
Eleusinian mythology